Woodbury Salterton is a village  from Exeter, in the civil parish of Woodbury, in the East Devon district, in the county of Devon, England. In 2018 it had an estimated population of 647. Woodbury Salterton has a church called Holy Trinity, a primary school on Stony Lane and a pub called the Digger's Rest.

History 
The name "Salterton" means "the salt-workers" or "salt-settlers" "tun". Salterton was a chapelry in Woodbury and Colaton-Raleigh parishes, in 1870-72 the chapelry had a population of 498.

References 

Villages in Devon
Woodbury, East Devon